Licola is a town in Victoria, Australia, located on Licola Road, in the Shire of Wellington, 254 kilometres east of Melbourne. At the 2016 census, Licola and the surrounding area had a population of 11.

Overview
The Lions Club owns a large section of land in Licola and operates a youth camp on site, the Licola Wilderness Village, which is immediately surrounded by farm land. The town is the southern gateway to the Alpine National Park. Its main industries are tourism, logging and farming. It has  one general store including post office and petrol station and a small number of houses. It is also the only Victorian town not connected to the mains electricity grid, generating its own power. The town is frequented by motorbike riders, campers and hikers alike.

History
The first Licola Post Office opened on 14 September 1908 and was renamed Glenfalloch in 1912. A Licola Post Office was again open 1914–1919, 1920–1923 and 1954–1993.

In July 2007, Licola suffered serious floods which caused a great deal of damage to roads, farms and national park areas. The main road from Heyfield was closed for two months following the destruction of the heritage-listed Cheynes Bridge, which was subsequently rebuilt.

References

External links

Towns in Victoria (Australia)
Shire of Wellington